Trudie Jeanette Adams disappeared in the early hours of 25 June 1978 after attending a dance at the Newport Surf Life Saving Club, New South Wales, Australia. She left the event early before hitchhiking home, at which point she entered a vehicle on Barrenjoey Road and has not been seen since. Her disappearance is significant in that it sparked New South Wales' biggest missing person search at the time, sparked extensive and ongoing national media attention, and eventually a A$250,000 reward.

Disappearance and investigation
Trudie Adams' parents and ex-boyfriend, Steven Norris, reported her missing on 25 June 1978 after she failed to arrive home from the dance. Although police initially believed that the car she entered was a green Kombi van, Norris, as the main eyewitness, stated that he saw her enter a light-coloured 1977 Holden panel van. Police who investigated the case originally cast suspicion on Norris. Eventually he was cleared, and suspicion widened to those involved in the drug scene.

In the days after the attacks, a number of female rape victims, who had been assaulted by two disguised men, began to report a series of then-unknown crimes to police. Investigators then suspected that Adams' disappearance was linked to the 14 now-known violent rapes that had occurred in the Northern Beaches between 1971 and 1978, and may also be related to an attempted attack on a hitchhiker earlier on the evening of Adams' disappearance. On 16 August 1978, a reward of A$20,000 was offered by the New South Wales government, and over the years her suspected murder has been investigated by police four times.

Developments
 In 1992, the case was reopened based on a refocused interest in the possible involvement of the green Kombi van.
 In 2008, the reward was raised to A$250,000 for information which would lead to the conviction of her murderer(s).
 In 2009, the case's prime suspect, a convicted drug dealer and sex offender known as Neville Brian Tween, who was identified by some of the rape victims, was finally interviewed by police regarding Adams' disappearance. Tween, who had also been a police informant, denied any involvement in the disappearance or the rape cases (despite circumstantial evidence) and died in 2013.
 In 2011, an inquest was held in order to further investigate the disappearance of Adams, which resulted in the Coroner declaring that Adams died of "homicide or misadventure."
 In 2018, interest in the case was reignited by the airing of the second series of the Australian crime podcast Unravel and TV documentary Barrenjoey Road. A number of non-reported crimes and previously unknown victims have also come forward due to the airing of the podcast.

See also 
List of people who disappeared
Highway One (film)

References

1970s missing person cases
1978 in Australia
Crime in New South Wales
Unsolved crimes in Australia
Missing person cases in Australia
1959 births
June 1978 events in Australia
1978 crimes in Australia
Possibly living people